Opus Postumum was the last work by the German philosopher Immanuel Kant, who died in 1804. Although efforts to publish the manuscript were made in 1882, it was not until 1936–1938 that a German edition of the whole manuscript appeared.

History of the manuscript
One of the problems experienced in handling the manuscript is that the individual sheets of paper had not been bound, and following Kant's death curious people visiting his house messed up their order. Johann Friedrich Schultz, a close friend and trusted expositor of Kant was presented with manuscript by Kant's executor, . However Schultz declared the manuscript barely started and uneditable. Schultz then passed them onto Carl Christoph Schoen, who had married Kant's niece. Schoen attempted to edit the text, but abandoned the project. The manuscript remained lost amongst his papers for fifty years only to be discovered by his daughter after his death.

References

1938 non-fiction books
Books by Immanuel Kant
German non-fiction books